Brian Eugene Simmons (born June 21, 1975) is a former American college and professional football player who was a linebacker in the National Football League (NFL) for ten seasons.  He played college football for the University of North Carolina, and earned All-American honors.  He was drafted by the Cincinnati Bengals 17th overall in the 1998 NFL Draft, and he played professionally for the Bengals and New Orleans Saints of the NFL.

Early years
Simmons was born in New Bern, North Carolina.  He attended New Bern High School, where he was a letterman in high school football, basketball, baseball, and track for the New Bern Bears.

College career
Simmons attended the University of North Carolina at Chapel Hill, and played for the North Carolina Tar Heels football team from 1994 to 1997.  As a senior in 1997, he was recognized as a consensus first-team All-American after receiving first-team honors from Football News, the Associated Press, and the Walter Camp Foundation.

Professional career

Cincinnati Bengals
He was drafted in the 1998 NFL Draft by the Bengals, for whom he played nine seasons. Simmons missed all but one game of the 2000 season because of injury.

In 2001, the Bengals started the season 1–0. They faced the Super Bowl champion Baltimore Ravens in their second game. Right before the halftime, the Ravens were driving down field. They were on the goal line, and threw into the end zone. Brian Simmons picked off the pass, which led to Cincinnati's 21-10 win.

In 2003, the 1-4 Bengals were down 0–7 against the Ravens. With the Ravens about to score again, Simmons sacked rookie quarterback Kyle Boller, which forced a fumble, and led to Jon Kitna's 45-yard touchdown pass on third down. The Bengals won 34–26. A week later, the Bengals were 2-4 and were protecting a 27-24 lead against the Seattle Seahawks in the last six minutes. Simmons deflected a Matt Hasselbeck pass at the Cincinnati 34, then deflected another at the 24, which was intercepted by cornerback Jeff Burris to win the game.

In 2004, for the home season opener, the Bengals were down against the Miami Dolphins 0–3 at halftime. Three minutes into the second half, Simmons intercepted an A. J. Feeley pass and took it 50 yards for the Bengals' only score of the game. It allowed Carson Palmer to get rolling and drive downfield to set up Shayne Graham's game-winning field goal.

On February 28, 2007, Simmons was released from the Bengals.

New Orleans Saints
On March 6, 2007, he signed with the Saints. . On March 1, 2008 the Saints released Simmons after the acquisition of Jonathan Vilma.

Post career
On June 1, 2009, Simmons was named the Northeast regional scout for the Jacksonville Jaguars. Simmons serves as the color analyst for the Tar Heel Sports Network football broadcasts.

References

1975 births
Living people
All-American college football players
American football linebackers
Cincinnati Bengals players
New Orleans Saints players
North Carolina Tar Heels football players
Sportspeople from New Bern, North Carolina